The United Arab Emirates participated in the 3rd West Asian Games held in Doha, Qatar from December 1, 2005 to December 10, 2005. The United Arab Emirates ranked 5th with 7 gold medals in this edition of the West Asian Games.

References

West Asian Games
Nations at the 2005 West Asian Games
West Asian Games